Gopal Gupta is an Erik Jonsson Professor and the head of the Department of Computer Science at the University of Texas at Dallas.

Education 
Gupta has received a B.Tech. degree in computer science from Indian Institute of Technology, Kanpur, India in 1985. He received an M.S. degree in computer science from The University of North Carolina, Chapel Hill in 1987. He also has a Ph.D. degree in computer science from The University of North Carolina, Chapel Hill, which he received in 1991.

Career 
Gupta is an Erik Jonsson Chaired Professor and the head of the Department of Computer Science at the University of Texas at Dallas. He is the chief technology officer and co-founder of Interoperate.biz, Inc. He is also the co-founder and co-coordinator of COMPULOG AMERICAS, a network of research groups in the Western Hemisphere engaged in research on computational logic.

He has been active in research for over 25 years mainly in the field of programming languages, software engineering, parallel and distributed processing and assistive technology. His work has resulted in over 40 journal articles and 108 conference and workshop papers.

Awards and honors 
 President, Association for Logic Programming, 2010–2014.
 Computer science outstanding teacher of the year, University of Texas at Dallas, 2008.
 Best paper award. European Conferences on Web Services 2005

References 

Living people
Indian computer scientists
Year of birth missing (living people)